Bertram Steinberger (born 1 February 1986) is an Austrian tennis player playing on the ATP Challenger Tour. On 18 February 2008, he reached his highest ATP singles ranking of world No. 707, whilst his highest doubles ranking of No. 289 was reached on 25 July 2011.

Challenger finals

Doubles: 1 (1–0)

References

External links

1986 births
Living people
Austrian male tennis players